Irene Dufaux (born on 7 November 1960) is a Swiss sport shooter. She competed in rifle shooting events at the 1988 Summer Olympics.

Olympic results

References

1960 births
Living people
ISSF rifle shooters
Swiss female sport shooters
Shooters at the 1988 Summer Olympics
Olympic shooters of Switzerland